Ramgarh is a suburb/neighbourhood in the town Mughalpura (Lahore, Pakistan). It is a densely populated area . 

Aziz Bhatti Zone
}